DeMarcus De'Juan Nelson (born November 2, 1985) is an American-Serbian former professional basketball player. Standing at 1.93 m (6 ft 4 in) he played at the point guard position. He also holds Serbian citizenship as of 2014.

College career
Nelson played at the shooting guard position on the Duke Blue Devils men's basketball team.  He was also the lone captain of the team for the 2007–2008 season, which was his senior year.

College statistics

Professional career
Nelson was not drafted in the 2008 NBA draft, but he was signed by the Golden State Warriors on September 9, 2008.  He became the first undrafted rookie to start on opening night in the history of the NBA. On November 14, 2008, he and teammate Richard Hendrix were assigned to the Bakersfield Jam of the NBA D-League. He was recalled by the Warriors on December 16, 2008, but he was waived on January 6, 2009 to make room for Jermareo Davidson.

Nelson joined the Croatian Adriatic League club KK Zagreb in January 2009, but only played a single game. In March 2009, Nelson returned to the NBA D-League as a member of the Austin Toros.

On April 9, 2009 Nelson signed with the Chicago Bulls. On July 30, 2009 he was waived by the Bulls.

On August 29, 2009, he was signed by Scandone Avellino of the Italian Lega Basket Serie A for the 2009–10 season.

He played for the Milwaukee Bucks in the NBA Summer League in 2010.

On August 23, 2010, he was signed by Cholet Basket of France. Cholet Basket is qualified for the Euroleague for the 2010–11 season.

In July 2011 he signed with BC Donetsk in Ukraine. On November 15, 2011, he returned to Cholet Basket by signing a contract for the rest of the season.

In September 2012, he signed a one-year contract with the Serbian team Crvena zvezda Belgrade. In June 2013 he re-signed with them for one more season, with an option for a second year. He became the first foreign player to stay at the club for two seasons.

In November 2013, he was named EuroLeague MVP for Round 4. In April 2014, along with his teammate Boban Marjanović, he was selected to the Ideal Team of the 2013–14 ABA League season. He was also named to the All-EuroCup First Team in 2014.

On July 22, 2014, Panathinaikos announced the signing of Nelson, on a 1+1 year-deal.

On September 25, 2015, he signed a one-month deal with the French team Monaco, with the role to replace injured Larry Drew II. On December 23, 2015, he signed  for the rest of the season with the Spanish team Unicaja, with the role to replace injured Stefan Marković.

On October 15, 2016, Nelson signed with ASVEL Basket for the rest of the 2016–17 season. On July 8, 2017, he re-signed with ASVEL for two more seasons.

On January 29, 2020, he has signed with Limoges CSP of the LNB Pro A. Nelson re-signed with the team to a two-year extension on July 8, 2020.

Career statistics

NBA

Regular season

|-
| align="left" | 
| align="left" | Golden State
| 13 || 5 || 13.2 || .444 || .000 || .357 || 1.8 || 1.0 || .7 || .2 || 4.1
|- class="sortbottom"
| align="left" | Career
| align="left" |
| 13 || 5 || 13.2 || .444 || .000 || .357 || 1.8 || 1.0 || .7 || .2 || 4.1

Domestic leagues

EuroLeague

|-
| style="text-align:left;"| 2010–11
| style="text-align:left;"| Cholet
| 10 || 7 || 25.6 || .423 || .313 || .636 || 3.3 || 1.5 || .5 || .3 || 9.2 || 5.8
|-
| style="text-align:left;"| 2013–14
| style="text-align:left;"| Crvena zvezda
| 10 || 10 || 26.8 || .479 || .286 || .737 || 4.0 || 3.2 || 1.1 || .2 || 11.2 || 13.0
|-
| style="text-align:left;"| 2014–15
| style="text-align:left;"| Panathinaikos
| 18 || 0 || 17.8 || .402 || .130 || .625 || 2.4 || 2.2 || .6 || .2 || 5.8 || 5.6
|- class="sortbottom"
| style="text-align:left;"| Career
| style="text-align:left;"|
| 38 || 17 || 22.2 || .434 || .239 || .658 || 3.1 || 2.3 || .7 || .2 || 8.1 || 7.6

Personal life
DeMarcus attended high school at Vallejo High School in Vallejo, California and Sheldon High School in Sacramento, California. His Freshman, Sophomore, and Junior years were at Vallejo and his Senior year was at Sheldon.

He attained Serbian citizenship on July 24, 2014, late for a possible extension with Crvena zvezda.

See also 
 List of KK Crvena zvezda players with 100 games played

References

External links
 ABA League profile
 eurobasket.com profile
 EuroLeague profile
 Duke Blue Devils bio
 NBA D-League profile

1985 births
Living people
American men's basketball players
Serbian men's basketball players
American emigrants to Serbia
ABA League players
All-American college men's basketball players
American expatriate basketball people in Croatia
American expatriate basketball people in France
American expatriate basketball people in Germany
American expatriate basketball people in Italy
American expatriate basketball people in Serbia
American expatriate basketball people in Spain
American expatriate basketball people in Ukraine
AS Monaco Basket players
ASVEL Basket players
Austin Toros players
Bakersfield Jam players
Basketball players from Oakland, California
Baloncesto Málaga players
BC Donetsk players
Cholet Basket players
Duke Blue Devils men's basketball players
FC Bayern Munich basketball players
Golden State Warriors players
KK Crvena zvezda players
KK Zagreb players
Liga ACB players
Limoges CSP players
McDonald's High School All-Americans
Naturalized citizens of Serbia
Panathinaikos B.C. players
Parade High School All-Americans (boys' basketball)
Point guards
S.S. Felice Scandone players
Serbian expatriate basketball people in France
Serbian expatriate basketball people in Greece
Serbian expatriate basketball people in Monaco
Serbian expatriate basketball people in Spain
Serbian people of African-American descent
Shooting guards
Sportspeople from Elk Grove, California
Undrafted National Basketball Association players